Muhammad Ayub (1932–2008), was a Pakistani athlete who represented Pakistan at international and national athletics. He was also an officer in Pakistan Army, participated in 1965 war and received a Medal.

Career 
From 1952 to 1978 Ayub represented Pakistan. In 1970, 1972 and 1973 he participated in national Championships and won Gold Medals in Disc Throw, during this period he was also the Athletic Coach of Pakistan Sports Control Board. Afterwards he remained a coach for POF Athletic Team and served in B-20 POF Weapons Factory from 1979 to 1990. He died on 19 October 2008.

Participation

References

1932 births
2008 deaths
Pakistan Army officers
Pakistani male discus throwers
Olympic athletes of Pakistan
Athletes (track and field) at the 1956 Summer Olympics
Athletes (track and field) at the 1954 Asian Games
Athletes (track and field) at the 1958 Asian Games
Commonwealth Games competitors for Pakistan
Athletes (track and field) at the 1958 British Empire and Commonwealth Games
Athletes (track and field) at the 1962 British Empire and Commonwealth Games
Athletes (track and field) at the 1966 British Empire and Commonwealth Games
Asian Games medalists in athletics (track and field)
Asian Games silver medalists for Pakistan
Medalists at the 1958 Asian Games